Altynzhar is a rural locality (a selo) and the administrative center of Altynzharsky Selsoviet of Volodarsky District, Astrakhan Oblast, Russia. The population was 998 as of 2010. There are 18 streets.

Geography 
It is located on the Karazhar River, 18 km south of Volodarsky (the district's administrative centre) by road. Koshevanka is the nearest rural locality.

Gallery

References 

Rural localities in Volodarsky District, Astrakhan Oblast